Maria Niklińska (born December 28, 1983) is a Polish actress and singer. In 2003, she starred in the film An Ancient Tale: When the Sun Was a God directed by Jerzy Hoffman.

Career

Acting activities 
She made her acting debut as Es-toch in The Secret of Sagala. She has appeared in the following series: Klan (as Agata Wilczyńska), First Love (as Jagoda Borawska), Na dobre i na bad or Kryminalni. Her film debut was the role of Żywia in Jerzy Hoffman's Old Tale. She also played Tosia in the movie I'll Show You!

She played in the play Name Day, dir. Aleksandra Konieczna at the National Theater in Warsaw and the impresario performance Tiramisu. She also played Ophelia in the play Hamlet 44, dir. Paweł Passini, made to commemorate the 64th anniversary of the outbreak of the Warsaw Uprising. She played Aniela in Maiden Vows, dir. Jan Englert at the National Theater, she also appeared in Václav Havel's Departures, dir. Izabella Cywińska, staged at the Ateneum Theater in Warsaw. From February 14, 2010, she played in the play Pamiętnik virtunej lustnika (directed by Emilian Kamiński), staged at the Kamienica Theater. At the Capitol Theater, she performs in the play Carmen, or a play for 10 mobile phones, and she voiced the journey in victorious.

Discography 
Singles
 "Na północy" (2014, Universal Music Polska)
 "Na północy (remixy)" (2014, Universal Music Polska)

 Music videos 
 "Na północy" (2014, directed: Michał Braum)

References

External links
 

Polish film actresses
1983 births
Living people
21st-century Polish actresses